The  basketball tournament at the 1977 Southeast Asian Games took place from November 21–25, 1977, at Stadium Negara in Kuala Lumpur.

Tournament format
Both the men's and women's tournament were in round robin format, where the top team at the end of the single round won the gold medal, and the next two teams the silver and bronze, respectively.

Men's tournament

Participating nations
 
 
  (Anthony Dasalla, Bernardo Carpio, Jaime Javier, Eleazar Capacio, Jaime Manansala, Renato Lobo, Ramon Cruz, Angelito Ladores, Matthew Gaston, Alex Clarino, Joseph Herrera and Paul Velasco) Head Coach: Honesto Mayoralgo

Results

Women's tournament

Participating nations

Results

Medal table

Further reading
 Ninth SEA Games Kuala Lumpur '77 Official Report, The Ninth Sea Games Organizing Council, 1979
 SEA Games Programme, 20 September 1977, accessed 5 November 2017
Alinea, Eddie G. Moments to remember. Manila Times. 13 August 2017. Accessed 25 September 2019

1977 Southeast Asian Games events
1977
1977 in Asian basketball
International basketball competitions hosted by Malaysia